The Central Intercollegiate Athletic Association women's basketball tournament is the annual conference women's basketball championship tournament for the Central Intercollegiate Athletic Association. The tournament has been held annually since 1975. It is a single-elimination tournament and seeding is based on regular season records.

The winner receives the CIAA's automatic bid to the NCAA Division II women's basketball tournament.

Shaw have been the most successful team at the CIAA tournament, with eleven championships.

Results

Championship records

 Claflin and Winston-Salem State have not yet won the tournament
 Chowan and Saint Paul's never won the tournament as CIAA members
 Schools highlighted in pink are former members of the CIAA

See also
 MEAC women's basketball tournament

References

NCAA Division II women's basketball conference tournaments
Basketball Tournament, Women's
Recurring sporting events established in 1975